In mathematics, the Leray spectral sequence was a pioneering example in homological algebra, introduced in 1946 by Jean Leray. It is usually seen nowadays as a special case of the Grothendieck spectral sequence.

Definition

Thus the derived functors of  compute the sheaf cohomology for :

and which converges to 

This is called the Leray spectral sequence.

Generalizing to other sheaves and complexes of sheaves 
Note this result can be generalized by instead considering sheaves of modules over a locally constant sheaf of rings  for a fixed commutative ring . Then, one replaces sheaf cohomology with sheaf hypercohomology.

Construction 
The existence of the Leray spectral sequence is a direct application of the Grothendieck spectral sequencepg 19. This states that given additive functors

between Abelian categories having enough injectives,  a left-exact functor, and  sending injective objects to -acyclic objects, then there is an isomorphism of derived functors

for the derived categories . In the example above, we have the composition of derived functors

Classical definition

Let  be a continuous map of smooth manifolds. If  is an open cover of  form the Čech complex of a sheaf  with respect to cover  of 

The boundary maps  and maps  of sheaves on  together give a boundary map on the double complex 

of this complex is the de Rham cohomology of  Moreover, 
any double complex has a spectral sequence E with

where  is the presheaf on X sending  In this context, this is called the Leray spectral sequence.

The modern definition subsumes this, because the higher direct image functor  is the sheafification of the presheaf

Examples

 Let  be smooth manifolds, and  be simply connected, so . We calculate the Leray spectral sequence of the projection . If the cover  is good (finite intersections are ) then

Since  is simply connected, any locally constant presheaf is constant, so this is the constant presheaf . So the second page of the Leray spectral sequence is

So

Thus . This proves the Künneth theorem for  simply connected:

 If  is a general fiber bundle with fibre , the above applies, except that  is only a locally constant presheaf, not constant.

 All example computations with the Serre spectral sequence are the Leray sequence for the constant sheaf.

Degeneration theorem 

Easy examples can be computed if  is simply connected; for example a complete intersection of dimension  (this is because of the Hurewicz homomorphism and the Lefschetz hyperplane theorem). In this case the local systems  will have trivial monodromy, hence . For example, consider a smooth family  of genus 3 curves over a smooth K3 surface. Then, we have that

giving us the -page

Example with monodromy 
Another important example of a smooth projective family is the family associated to the elliptic curves

History and connection to other spectral sequences
At the time of Leray's work, neither of the two concepts involved (spectral sequence, sheaf cohomology) had reached anything like a definitive state. Therefore it is rarely the case that Leray's result is quoted in its original form. After much work, in the seminar of Henri Cartan in particular, the modern statement was obtained, though not the general Grothendieck spectral sequence.

Earlier (1948/9) the implications for fiber bundles were extracted in a form formally identical to that of the Serre spectral sequence, which makes no use of sheaves. This treatment, however, applied to Alexander–Spanier cohomology with compact supports, as applied to proper maps of locally compact Hausdorff spaces, as the derivation of the spectral sequence required a fine sheaf of real differential graded algebras on the total space, which was obtained by pulling back the de Rham complex along an embedding into a sphere. Jean-Pierre Serre, who needed a spectral sequence in homology that applied to path space fibrations, whose total spaces are almost never locally compact, thus was unable to use the original Leray spectral sequence and so derived a related spectral sequence whose cohomological variant agrees, for a compact fiber bundle on a well-behaved space with the sequence above.

In the formulation achieved by Alexander Grothendieck by about 1957, the Leray spectral sequence is the Grothendieck spectral sequence for the composition of two derived functors.

See also 

 Serre spectral sequence - for more examples
 Grothendieck spectral sequence - for abstract theory subsuming the construction for the Leray spectral sequence
 Mixed Hodge module

References

External links
 Leray spectral sequence Article in the Encyclopedia of Mathematics
 Leray spectral sequence for ringed spaces Article in The Stacks project

Spectral sequences
Theory of continuous functions
Sheaf theory